Vinaninony - Atsimo is a town and commune in Madagascar. It belongs to the district of Faratsiho, which is a part of Vakinankaratra Region. The population of the commune was 41,798 inhabitants in 2018.

Primary and junior level secondary education are available in town. The majority 89% of the population of the commune are farmers, while an additional 10% receives their livelihood from raising livestock. The most important crop is rice, while other important products are wheat and potatoes. Services provide employment for 1% of the population.

References 

Populated places in Vakinankaratra